Keith Cronin (born 18 July 1986) is an Irish rally driver and 4-time winner of the British Rally Championship. He won the 2009 British Rally Championship in his first year in the series, defeating multiple champion Mark Higgins in his privately entered TTec Rally Prep Cronin Motorsport Mitsubishi Lancer Evolution IX. Cronin successfully defended his title in 2010 driving a Subaru Impreza. After missing the 2011 season, he returned to the Championship in 2012. He won three out of six events in his Citroen DS3 R3, meaning he won the overall title for the third time in his career. 2017 saw him crowned British Rally Champion for the fourth time.

In addition to competing in national events, in 2010 Cronin took part in two Intercontinental Rally Challenge events, driving a Proton Satria Neo S2000 for the Proton R3 Malaysia Rally Team.

In 2012, Cronin also competed in three rounds of the French Citroen Racing Trophy.

In 2013, Cronin won the Galway International Rally in a Subaru S11 WRC.

References

External links

Keith Cronin Motorsport

1986 births
Living people
Irish rally drivers